UFC on Fox: Weidman vs. Gastelum (also known as UFC on Fox 25) was a mixed martial arts event produced by the Ultimate Fighting Championship held on July 22, 2017 at the Nassau Veterans Memorial Coliseum in Uniondale, New York.

Background
The event was the first that the UFC has hosted on Long Island. 

The event was headlined by a middleweight bout between former UFC Middleweight Champion Chris Weidman and The Ultimate Fighter: Team Jones vs. Team Sonnen middleweight winner Kelvin Gastelum.

A featherweight bout between former UFC Featherweight Championship challengers Ricardo Lamas and Chan Sung Jung was originally in the works to headline or co-headline this event. The pairing was originally slated to take place in July 2013 at UFC 162, but Jung was pulled from the bout in favor of a title fight against then champion José Aldo at UFC 163. On May 12, the bout was confirmed for UFC 214.

A light heavyweight bout between Gian Villante and Patrick Cummins was originally booked for UFC Fight Night: Lewis vs. Abdurakhimov in December 2016. However, Cummins pulled out a week before the event due to a staph infection. The fight eventually took place at this event.

A heavyweight bout between Christian Colombo and Damian Grabowski was expected to take place at UFC Fight Night: Gustafsson vs. Teixeira. However, the pairing was scrapped as both fighters sustained injuries in the weeks leading up to the event. The fight was rescheduled to take place at this event. Subsequently, Colombo was removed from the fight on June 22 for undisclosed reasons and was replaced by Chase Sherman.

Alessio Di Chirico was expected to face Rafael Natal, but pulled out in the weeks leading up to the event due to a neck injury and was replaced by promotional newcomer Eryk Anders.

Results

Bonus awards
The following fighters were awarded $50,000 bonuses:
Fight of the Night: Elizeu Zaleski dos Santos vs. Lyman Good
Performance of the Night: Alex Oliveira and Júnior Albini

See also
2017 in UFC
List of UFC events
Mixed martial arts in New York

References

Fox UFC
Mixed martial arts in New York (state)
Sports in Long Island
2017 in sports in New York (state)
2017 in mixed martial arts
July 2017 sports events in the United States
Events in Uniondale, New York
Events on Long Island